Bo'ai County is a county of Henan, China. It is under the administration of the Jiaozuo city.

Administrative divisions
As 2012, this county is divided to 7 towns and 3 townships.
Towns

Townships
Jincheng Township
Sujiazuo Township
Zhaihuo Township

Climate

References

 
County-level divisions of Henan
Jiaozuo